Many fungi and microorganisms have been domesticated by humans for use in food production, medicine, and research. The following is a list of domesticated fungi and microorganisms:

Food

Research and medicine

Industry

See also
 List of domesticated plants
 List of domesticated animals
 Agriculture

References 

Domesticated fungi and microorganisms
Domesticated fungi and microorganisms